Cape Southwest is a headland in Qikiqtaaluk Region, Nunavut, Canada. It is located on Amund Ringnes Island near Cape Ludwig, where Norwegian Bay enters Massey Sound. Cape Maundy Thursday is to the northwest.

References
 Atlas of Canada

Peninsulas of Qikiqtaaluk Region
Sverdrup Islands